The women's 57 kilograms (Lightweight) competition at the 2002 Asian Games in Busan was held on 2 October at the Gudeok Gymnasium.

Schedule
All times are Korea Standard Time (UTC+09:00)

Results

Main bracket

Repechage

References
2002 Asian Games Report, Page 466

External links
 
 Official website

W57
Judo at the Asian Games Women's Lightweight
Asian W57